

I 
Idlewild and Soak Zone (Ligonier, Pennsylvania, United States)
IMG Worlds of Adventure (Dubai, United Arab Emirates)
Indiana Beach (Monticello, Indiana, United States)
Isla de los Juegos (Moreno, Buenos Aires, Argentina)

J 
Joyland Amusement Park (Lubbock, Texas, United States)
Joyland Amusement Park (Wichita, Kansas, United States)
Joypolis (Yokohama, Japan)
Julianatoren (Apeldoorn, Netherlands)

K 
Kalahari Resorts (Wisconsin Dells, Wisconsin, Sandusky, Ohio, Pocono Manor, Pennsylvania,  and  Round Rock, Texas)
Kennywood (West Mifflin, Pennsylvania, United States)
Kernie's Familiepark (Kalkar, Germany)
Kiddie Park (San Antonio, Texas, United States)
Kid's World (Long Branch, New Jersey, United States)
Kings Dominion (Doswell, Virginia, United States)
Kings Island (Mason, Ohio, United States)
Knoebels Amusement Park & Resort (Elysburg, Pennsylvania, United States)
Knott's Berry Farm (Buena Park, California, United States)
Knott's Soak City (Buena Park, United States)
Kolmarden Wildlife Park (Bråviken bay, Sweden)

L 
La Ronde (Île Sainte-Hélène, Montreal, Quebec, Canada)
Lagoon (Farmington, Utah, United States)
Lake Compounce (Bristol, Connecticut, United States)
Lakemont Park (Altoona, Pennsylvania, United States)
Lakeside Amusement Park (Denver, Colorado, United States)
Legoland Billund (Billund, Denmark)
Legoland California (Carlsbad, California, United States)
Legoland Deutschland (Günzburg, Germany)
Legoland Dubai (Dubai, United Arab Emirates)
Legoland Florida (Winter Haven, Florida, United States)
Legoland Japan (Nagoya, Japan)
Legoland Malaysia Resort (Johor Bahru, Malaysia)
Legoland New York (Goshen, New York, United States)
Legoland Windsor (Windsor, Berkshire, England)
Leisureland Fair (Hastings, Victoria, Australia)
Leofoo Village Theme Park (Hsinchu, Taiwan)
Libertyland (Memphis, Tennessee, United States)
Lihpao Land (Houli District, Taichung, Taiwan)
Linnanmäki (Helsinki, Finland)
Liseberg (Gothenburg, Sweden)
Lotte World (Seoul, South Korea)
Loudoun Castle (Galston, East Ayrshire, Scotland) closed 2010
Luna Park Melbourne (Melbourne, Victoria, Australia)
Luna Park Sydney (Sydney, New South Wales, Australia)

M 
M&Ds (Motherwell, Lanarkshire, Scotland)
Magic Mountain (Moncton, New Brunswick, Canada)
Magic Park (Thessaloniki, Greece)
Magic Planet (Thiruvananthapuram, India)
Magic Springs and Crystal Falls (Hot Springs, Arkansas, United States)
Magic World (Pigeon Forge, Tennessee, United States)
Marineland (Niagara Falls, Ontario, Canada)
MGM Grand Adventures (Las Vegas, Nevada, United States)
Michigan's Adventure (Muskegon County, Michigan, United States)
Miracle Strip (Panama City, Florida, United States)
Moomin World (Naantali, Finland)
Morey's Piers (Wildwood, New Jersey, United States)
Movie Park Germany (Bottrop, Germany)
Movie World (aka Warner Bros. Movie World) (Brisbane, Queensland, Australia)
Mt. Olympus Water & Theme Park (Wisconsin Dells, Wisconsin, United States)
Mundo Marino (San Clemente del Tuyú, Buenos Aires, Argentina)
Myrtle Beach Pavilion (Myrtle Beach, South Carolina, United States)

I

nl:Lijst van attractieparken (I-M)
sv:Lista över nöjesparker (I-L)